Bet Nissim Synagogue is a synagogue built in 1840s in Kuzguncuk, Istanbul, Turkey. With its Ehal-ha-Kodesh dating from the end of 18th century, it was restored and reopened to the public. Visits are possible through appointment from the Chief Rabbinate.

See also
 History of the Jews in Turkey
 List of synagogues in Turkey

References and notes

External links
 Chief Rabbinate of Turkey
 Shalom Newspaper - The main Jewish newspaper in Turkey

Synagogues completed in the 1840s
Synagogues in Istanbul
Bosphorus
Üsküdar
19th-century architecture in Turkey